Steccherinum ochraceum, known as ochre spreading tooth, is a hydnoid fungus of the family Steccherinaceae. It is a plant pathogen infecting sweetgum trees. It can also be found in Nepal. It was originally described as Hydnum ochraceum by Johann Friedrich Gmelin in 1792, and later transferred to the genus Steccherinum by Samuel Frederick Gray in 1821.

References

Fungi described in 1792
Fungal tree pathogens and diseases
Steccherinaceae
Taxa named by Christiaan Hendrik Persoon